The Battle of Brooklyn was a battle during the American Revolutionary War. 

Battle of Brooklyn may also refer to:

 Battle of Brooklyn (college rivalry), an athletics rivalry between St. Francis College and Long Island University
 Skirmish near Brooklyn, Kansas, a battle during the American Civil War